Hong Kong–Israel relations refer to relations between Hong Kong and Israel. Israel has a consulate in Hong Kong, while Hong Kong is represented through the Hong Kong Economic and Trade Office in addition to the Chinese embassy in Tel Aviv.

History
In 1958, businessman Victor Zirinsky was appointed Israel's Honorary Consul in Hong Kong and served in this capacity until Israel's diplomatic presence was formally established in 1985, when Reuven Merhav was appointed to be the Consul General as a joint representative for Hong Kong and Macau. 

Hong Kong's interest in tech start-ups has led to increasing ties between the countries. InvestHK, a department of the Hong Kong Government, has stated it will help Israeli entrepreneurs set up operations in the city. Israeli start-ups enrolled in an accelerator program called StartMeUpHK that offers investments of $500,000, a trip to Hong Kong, mentorship programs with Asian business executives and admission to major tech events in the region.

In 2015, Israel signed an agreement with Hong Kong to increase cooperation in technology and R&D. A new program was established for projects focusing on research and development in the industrial sector. In Hong Kong, entrepreneurs receive funding through the ESS (Enterprise Support Scheme) program, managed by the Innovation and Technology Fund (ITF); in Israel, funding is granted by the Office of the Chief Scientist at the Israeli Ministry of Economy and Industry and the program is managed by the Office of the Chief Scientist, the Israeli Industry Center for Research and Development (MATIMOP).

In 2013, Hong Kong billionaire Li Ka-shing donated $130 million to the Technion-Israel Institute of Technology. 

Speaker of the Israeli parliament, Yuli Edelstein, traveled to Hong Kong in 2016 to strengthen ties between Israel and Hong Kong. He hailed the good ties between the two entities.

Tourism and Transportation
According to Hong Kong Secretary for Commerce and Economic Development, who visited Israel in November 2016, Israel is Hong Kong's largest visitor source market in the Middle East. Some 64,000 Israelis traveled to Hong Kong in 2015.

Cathay Pacific, Hong Kong's national airline, inaugurated flights from Hong Kong to Tel Aviv in March 2017.

Controversy
In 2017, at a mass gathering of Hong Kong police officers and supporters after the Beating of Ken Tsang incident, a speaker compared the public insults on police with the persecution of Jews during World War II. While the two cases are hardly comparable, the Israeli consulate on 23 February 2017 expressed regret over the speaker's comment. In response, Hong Kong police force spokesman replied that the remarks did not represent the force.

See also
Foreign relations of Israel

References

Bilateral relations of Hong Kong
Bilateral relations of Israel